Roughton Scrubs is a small woodland beside the B1191 (Horncastle Road) to the north east of the village of Woodhall Spa in Lincolnshire on Roughton Moor. Bordering it to the south west is Big Rouse Holt with the area to the north across Horncastle Road known as The Wilderness where can be found evidence of medieval Ridge and Furrow farming surrounding the embankment of the long abandoned Woodhall Spa to Horncastle railway.

Forests and woodlands of Lincolnshire